"What Do You Got?" is a song by American rock band Bon Jovi. It is one of four songs written for the band's Greatest Hits album, released in November 2010. The song is the first single from the compilation album. The song was released on the band's official website on August 27. It was also released to radio airplay on August 27. It was officially released on September 21, 2010 as a digital download, but the physical single was released in Germany on October 22, 2010.

Background and lyrical content
"What Do You Got?" was written by Jon Bon Jovi, Richie Sambora and Brett James, produced by Howard Benson and co-produced by Jon Bon Jovi and Sambora. It was recorded in Bay 7 Studios in Valley Village and Sparky Dark Studios in Calabasas, California. The song was written during sessions for The Circle (2009), but it didn't fit that album, so band decided to hold it and finished it for the Greatest Hits (2010).

Lyrically, the song is about the aesthetics of love. Richie Sambora explained: "It's a worldly thing and it doesn't have to be exactly about romance. It could be about with your family, daughter or son. What do you got if you ain't got love. It's a profound statement in its simplicity."

Music video
The music video was directed by Wayne Isham and produced by Dana Marshall. Isham explained: "I dug the 3D process, and it was awesome to execute it with long-time friends and collaborators Bon Jovi. We've worked together a long time, evolving and growing, so I'm happy to continue that tradition with the new medium of 3D".

Release and reception
Originally, Jon Bon Jovi didn't want to release "What Do You Got?" as the first single and instead favored "No Apologies". He said: "If anyone wants to pick a single, you tell me. What do I know? That was the one that floated to the top, and I was taken aback because it was the (last) of the five I would've picked. But people have really been relating to the lyric, and seemingly for...radio, it's a hit."

Stephen Thomas Erlewine from Allmusic said that "What Do You Got?" and "No Apologies" "will likely not make any subsequent best-of". Mike Diver from BBC said that the song is a "by-the-book slowie worthy of a few lighters held aloft". Glenn Osrin from Examiner.com said the song "artistically is as slick, smooth and musically competent as fans expect of Bon Jovi". He also stated that "Jon's voice is crisp and clear, up in front in the mix; and Richie Sambora's guitar work is neat, clean, and growing more minimal by the minute". Describing the composition, Osrin said that song "continues the band's trend of recording music that tries to be more socially conscious than rollicking".

Track listing

Personnel
Songwriting and production 
Jon Bon Jovi – writer, co-producer
Richie Sambora – writer, co-producer
Brett James – writer
Howard Benson – producer
Mike Plotnikoff – recording engineer
Chris Lord-Alge – mixing engineer

Musicians
Jon Bon Jovi – lead vocals, rhythm guitar
Richie Sambora – lead guitar, harmony vocals
David Bryan – keyboards, backing vocals
Tico Torres – drums, percussion 
Hugh McDonald – bass guitar, backing vocals

Chart performance

Weekly charts

Year-end charts

Releases

In TV
"What Do You Got?" was used in a promotional video for Grey's Anatomy in Canada.

References

Bon Jovi songs
2010 songs
2010 singles
Songs written by Jon Bon Jovi
Songs written by Brett James
Songs written by Richie Sambora
Music videos directed by Wayne Isham
Island Records singles
Country rock songs
Song recordings produced by Howard Benson